Chappell is a lunar impact crater on the far side of the Moon, in the northern hemisphere just to the north of the crater Debye. It is in a heavily bombarded section of the surface, and much of its outer rim is overlain by smaller craters. The northern rim in particular has been almost completely disintegrated, while small craters also overlie the rim to the northwest and southeast. What remains of the rim forms a rounded, somewhat irregular edge to the crater depression.

In contrast, the interior floor is not notably marked by impacts, except for a few tiny craterlets. The interior surface is more level and featureless compared to the rugged terrain surrounding it. Near the floor's midpoint is a low, rounded central ridge.

Satellite craters
By convention these features are identified on lunar maps by placing the letter on the side of the crater midpoint that is closest to Chappell.

References

 
 
 
 
 
 
 
 
 
 
 
 

Impact craters on the Moon